Marion Laine is a French actor, screenwriter and film director. Her 2008 film A Simple Heart was entered into the 30th Moscow International Film Festival where it won the Special Jury Prize.

Filmography

As an actor
Équipe de nuit (1991)
Merci la vie (1991)
Sic transit (1991)
Les Merisiers (1992)
Revivre (1992)
Je suis ton châtiment (1996)
Le Contre-ciel (1996)
Julie Lescaut (1996, one TV episode)
Le R.I.F. (1996, one TV episode)
Madame le Proviseur (1996, one TV episode)
Dossier: disparus (1998, one TV episode)
Pour mon fils (1998, one TV episode)
Rendez-vous (2004, short film)

As a screenwriter
Derriere la porte (1999, short film)
Hotel des acacias (2003, short film)
A Simple Heart (2008)
Des vents contraires (2011)
Le fil d'Ariane (2012)
An Open Heart, (2012)

As a director
Derrière la porte (1999, short film)
Hotel des acacias (2003, short film)
A Simple Heart (2008)
Des vents contraires (2011)
Le fil d'Ariane (2012)
An Open Heart (2012)
On the road to paradise (2015, written by Sophie Galibert)

References

External links

Year of birth missing (living people)
Living people
French film actresses
French film directors
20th-century French actresses
21st-century French actresses
French television actresses
French women film directors
French women screenwriters
French screenwriters